Anton is a 2008 Irish action thriller film directed by Graham Cantwell. It stars Anthony Fox as Anton, a man drawn into the troubles along the Northern Ireland Border in 1972. The film also features Gerard McSorley, Laura Way, Vincent Fegan, Andy Smith and Ronan Wilmot.

The film was written for the screen by Anthony Fox. Anton was produced by Patrick Clarke and Anthony Fox. EastWest Film Distribution  and High Fliers Films released the film to theatres in Ireland and the UK on October 8, 2008. Anton was released in territories outside of Ireland under the title, Trapped. The film was nominated for 3 Irish Film Awards in 2009.  The theme song, One was written and performed by Greg Pearle, John Illsley and Paul Brady.

Plot 
When Anton O'Neill returns home after five years at sea, he finds that 1970's Ireland is a radically different place to the one he left behind. Northern Ireland is in flames, and civil unrest has spilled south of the border to his beloved home in County Cavan. Anton’s attempts to create a life for himself and his young family are violently interrupted when his experience with explosives attracts the attention of dangerous subversives. Drawn into this illicit world against the wishes of his family, he is forced to choose between the woman he loves and the justice he believes in, all the while trying to stay one step ahead of Lynch, a corrupt detective hell bent on framing him. Falsely imprisoned, he engineers his escape and flees to Paris, but when he returns to salvage his original dream the scene is set for a final confrontation with his former comrades

Cast 
 Gerard McSorley as Detective Lynch
 Anthony Fox as Anton
 Laura Way as Maria
 Ronan Wilmott as Johnny
 Andy Smith as Brendan
 Cillian Roche as Edward
 Vincent Fegan as Diarmuid
 Griet Van Damme as Sophie
 Rachel Rath as Detective Byrne
 Richard Wall as Detective Thornton
 Rory Mullen as Detective Flynn
 Sean Stewart as Steven
 Patrick Clarke as Barrister Macken
 Emmett J. Scanlan as Prison Officer McMahon

References

External links

2008 films
2008 action thriller films
Irish action thriller films
2000s English-language films
English-language Irish films